During the 1994–95 English football season, Tottenham Hotspur F.C. competed in the FA Premier League.

Season summary
Tottenham Hotspur began the season coming to terms with arguably the heaviest punishment ever handed out to an English club. As punishment for financial irregularities committed under the club's previous owners during the 1980s, they were fined £600,000 and were docked 12 league points as well as being banned from the 1994-95 FA Cup. Manager Ossie Ardiles reacted defiantly by adopting an impressive new attacking formation, while chairman Alan Sugar challenged his club's sanctions in court. The fine was later increased to £1.5 million, but the points deduction and FA Cup ban were eventually revoked (Swindon Town, who had won promotion under Ardiles to the top flight in the 1990 play-offs, were initially relegated to the Third Division for illegal payments to players, before being allowed to stay in the Second).

On the field, the new ultra-attacking style of football was not bringing as much success as Ardiles might have liked and in November he paid for these shortcomings with his job, following a 3–0 defeat in the League Cup to Notts County. QPR manager Gerry Francis was named as his successor, and guided Spurs to seventh in the final table – their highest finish for five years. He also took them to the semi-finals of the FA Cup where their Wembley dream was crushed by Everton, who ran out 4–1 winners.

The close season saw 30-goal striker, and FWA Player of the Year, Jürgen Klinsmann return to his homeland in a £1.5million move to Bayern Munich, and in came Chris Armstrong from Crystal Palace as his replacement. At a club record fee of £4.5million 24-year-old Armstrong was slammed as a "waste of money" by many supporters, who were sceptical of such a large sum of money being spent on a player who had scored just nine league goals (although his tally for 1994–95 reached 19 thanks to Palace's cup exploits), seen his old club relegated and failed a drugs test.

Gheorghe Popescu and Nick Barmby also moved on at the end of the season, leaving Francis to re-organise in midfield.

Final league table

Results summary

Results by matchday

Results
Tottenham Hotspur's score comes first

Legend

FA Premier League

FA Cup

League Cup

Squad

Left club during season

Reserve squad

Transfers

In

Out

Transfers in:  £7,500,000
Transfers out:  £3,265,000
Total spending:  £4,235,000

Statistics

Appearances and goals

|-
! colspan=14 style=background:#dcdcdc; text-align:center| Goalkeepers

|-
! colspan=14 style=background:#dcdcdc; text-align:center| Defenders

|-
! colspan=14 style=background:#dcdcdc; text-align:center| Midfielders

|-
! colspan=14 style=background:#dcdcdc; text-align:center| Forwards

|-
! colspan=14 style=background:#dcdcdc; text-align:center| Players transferred out during the season

Goal scorers 

The list is sorted by shirt number when total goals are equal.

Clean sheets

References

Tottenham Hotspur F.C. seasons
Tottenham Hotspur